Bratovo is a village in Burgas Municipality, Bulgaria. It is about seven kilometres outside Burgas city centre. Some locals are employed by the oil company Lukoil, 15.6 km outside Bratovo. Agriculture is also a major economic activity in Bratovo. 

The municipality recently resurfaced the roads around the village and a new school has been opened in the village. Brat School is a prosperous village and some affluent families reside nearby.

Bratovo also has its own microclimate and always seems to be a few degrees warmer than many of its surrounding neighbours. The telephone code to the village of Bratovo is 0562732 from Bulgaria and international is 00359562732. The nearest villages to Bratovo are Ravnets and Dolno Ezerovo.

References

External links 
https://web.archive.org/web/20110708091351/http://www.bratovo.com/

Villages in Burgas Province